Ned Dowd (born May 26, 1950 in Boston, Massachusetts) is an American film producer and former actor.

Career
After graduating from Bowdoin College in 1972, Dowd earned a master's degree at McGill University and played professional hockey.  The film, Slap Shot (1977), written by his sister, Nancy Dowd, is based in part on his experiences playing in the minor leagues.  Dowd appeared in the film as notorious hockey player Ogie Ogelthorpe. His wife, Nancy N. Dowd (not to be confused with his sister), also appears in the movie.

He continued to occasionally act until 1996, but focused his career on becoming an assistant director and eventually a line producer.  He had small parts in several films, the last being Bottle Rocket (1996), and has been a producer of such films as Last of the Mohicans (1992), Shanghai Noon (2000), Wonder Boys (2000), and Apocalypto (2006).

External links
 
Bowdoin Campus News: Film Producer Ned Dowd Offers Free Screening
Ned Dowd Hockey Database Stats

American male actors
American film producers
Bowdoin Polar Bears men's ice hockey players
Bowdoin College alumni
Johnstown Jets players
Living people
McGill University alumni
1950 births